OppenheimerFunds, Inc. was a global asset manager. As of February 28, 2019, the company managed over $260 billion in assets in over 13,000,000 investor accounts. In May 2019, the company was acquired by Invesco.

OppenheimerFunds had 16 investment management teams that oversaw actively managed equity, fixed income, alternative, and multi-asset portfolios, and exchange-traded funds. Customers included financial advisors and wealth managers and their clients, as well as institutional investors, corporations, financial endowments, foundations, and sovereign wealth funds.

History
The company was founded in 1959.

In 1987, British and Commonwealth Holdings acquired Mercantile House and gained control of OppenheimerFunds.

In 1990, the company was acquired by Massachusetts Mutual Life Insurance Company.

In July 2012, OppenheimerFunds acquired SteelPath, enabling clients to invest in master limited partnerships.

In 2015, the firm acquired RevenueShares to expand its offerings into the  smart beta space.

In 2016, it launched a suite of smart beta exchange-traded funds, including environmental, social and corporate governance offerings.

In 2017, it acquired SNW Asset Management, expanding its fixed income offerings into high-quality municipal bonds and customized separately managed accounts.

In October 2017, the firm opened its headquarters for Europe, the Middle East and Africa (EMEA) in London.

In October 2017, the firm formed a joint venture with The Carlyle Group to provide global private credit for high-net-worth individuals and advisors primarily focused on the U.S. market.

On May 24, 2019, Invesco acquired the company.

Philanthropy
The firm's corporate philanthropy initiatives included its 10,000 Kids by 2020 program, which aimed to introduce 10,000 students to numeracy programs through nonprofit partnerships and active employee volunteerism. The firm worked with organizations including the National Museum of Mathematics, the Boys & Girls Clubs of America, and Cross-Cultural Solutions.

Awards and recognition
OppenheimerFunds was named as the Best Place to Work in Money Management for 2017 by Pensions & Investments.

Fortune named the firm one of the 40 Best Workplaces in Financial Services and Insurance, and 25 Best Large Workplaces in New York.

In 2019, the company earned 19 Lipper Fund Awards in four asset classes.

References

1959 establishments in New York (state)
2019 disestablishments in New York (state)
1987 mergers and acquisitions
1990 mergers and acquisitions
2019 mergers and acquisitions
American companies disestablished in 2019
Defunct financial services companies of the United States
American companies established in 1959
Financial services companies established in 1959
Financial services companies disestablished in 2019